Christos Nalbantis (born 17 May 1944) is a retired Greek football defender.

References

1944 births
Living people
Greek footballers
Aris Thessaloniki F.C. players
Athlitiki Enosi Larissa F.C. players
Makedonikos F.C. players
Greece international footballers
Association football defenders
Aris Thessaloniki F.C. managers
Panserraikos F.C. managers
Greek football managers
Footballers from Central Macedonia
People from Thessaloniki (regional unit)